The former Washington County Courthouse is an historic building at 3481 Kingstown Road in South Kingstown, Rhode Island. Built in 1892, it was added to the National Register of Historic Places in 1992 as Washington County Court House.

Since 1991, court has been held in the McGrath Judicial Complex at 4800 Tower Hill Road in the village of Wakefield, also in South Kingstown.

The building is now the Courthouse Center for the Arts at Historic Washington County Courthouse

Gallery

See also
National Register of Historic Places listings in Washington County, Rhode Island

References

External links
Report of the Washington County Court House Commission from the Rhode Island State Archives

County courthouses in Rhode Island
Buildings and structures in South Kingstown, Rhode Island
County Courthouse
Government buildings completed in 1892
Courthouses on the National Register of Historic Places in Rhode Island
National Register of Historic Places in Washington County, Rhode Island
Tourist attractions in Washington County, Rhode Island
Gothic Revival architecture in Rhode Island